Edgewood Historic District may refer to:

in the United States
(by state)
 Edgewood Park Historic District, New Haven, CT, listed on the NRHP in Connecticut
 Edgewood Historic District-Taft Estate Plat, Cranston, RI, listed on the NRHP in Rhode Island
 Edgewood Historic District (Venice, Florida), listed on the NRHP in Florida
 Village of Edgewood Historic District, Edgewood, Pennsylvania, listed on the NRHP in Pennsylvania
 Edgewood Historic District (Charleston, West Virginia), listed on the NRHP in West Virginia
 Woodsdale-Edgewood Neighborhood Historic District, Wheeling, West Virginia, listed on the NRHP in West Virginia
 Edgewood Place Historic District, La Crosse, WI, listed on the NRHP in Wisconsin
 Edgewood College Mound Group Archeological District, Madison, WI, listed on the NRHP in Wisconsin